Rhodanthemum syn. Chrysanthemopsis, Pyrethropsis (Moroccan daisy), is a genus of flowering plants in the family Asteraceae, mostly native to exposed rocky places in Northern Africa (Morocco and Algeria). Formerly included in either Chrysanthemum or Leucanthemum, the 10 or 15 species of Rhodanthemum display many similarities to their former congeners, with composite daisy-like flowers. They are mat-forming, prostrate perennials or subshrubs, and some are cultivated as ornamental plants.

The botanical name comes from the Greek ῥόδον (rose) + ἄνθεμον (flower).

Species
The International Plant Names Index lists the following species:

References

Anthemideae
Asteraceae genera